Christopher Robert Kerr (born 28 June 1984 in Auburn, California, United States) is a former motorcycle speedway rider, from the United States. He is nicknamed "The Tiger" and represented USA in the 2007 Speedway World Cup.

Career
He first rode in the United Kingdom when he appeared with the 2005 USA Dream Team tour. He signed with the Redcar Bears in the British 2006 Premier League. In 2009, he rode for the Wolverhampton Wolves in the Elite League and doubled up with the Newport Wasps in the Premier League.

In 2010, he rode for Wolves before one final season in 2011 with Birmingham.

References 

American speedway riders
1984 births
Living people
Redcar Bears riders
Wolverhampton Wolves riders
People from Auburn, California